Vivi-Anne Hultén (25 August 1911 – 15 January 2003) was a Swedish figure skater who competed in ladies' singles. She was the 1936 Olympic bronze medalist, a four-time World medalist, a two-time European bronze medalist, and a ten-time Swedish national champion.

Personal life
Vivi-Anne Hultén was born in Antwerp, Belgium. She was married twice, first to the American steel importer Nils Tholand. In 1942, she married Gene Theslof, a Finnish figure skater and gymnast, with whom she had a son by the same name. The Teslofs trained their son Gene Theslof III to become a leading adagio skater who toured with Holiday on Ice in the USA during the 1960s. He later became a business executive in California. Hultén died at 91 of heart failure in Corona del Mar, California, surviving her husband by 20 years. She was the grandmother of American professional soccer coach Nick Theslof.

Career
Hultén was coached by a brother of Gillis Grafström. She finished fifth at the 1932 Winter Olympics. In 1933, she finished second to Sonja Henie at the 1933 World Championships held in Stockholm.

Hultén won the bronze medal at the 1936 Winter Olympics in Garmisch-Partenkirchen. When told to do a Nazi salute to Hitler, she declined and said "I am from Sweden. I don't do things like that." Swedish newspapers have named her the country's all-time female athlete. A lake in Budapest has a statue of her performing a spiral.

After turning professional, Hultén toured with the Ice Follies, Ice Cycles, and Ice Capades. She formed an adagio pair with  Theslof, her future husband, who had skated with Henie for seven years, and the pair toured the United States and Europe. In the mid 1960s, she settled in the United States and opened a large skating school in St. Paul, Minnesota with Theslof.

Hultén was hired as a skating coach by Herb Brooks for his Minnesota North Stars hockey team. She performed for the King and Queen of Sweden and also skated in ten ice shows with the Ice Capades in Minneapolis, Minnesota up until the age of 80. She actively taught on the ice until age 86.

Results

References

Further reading 

 

1911 births
Swedish female single skaters
Olympic figure skaters of Sweden
Figure skaters at the 1932 Winter Olympics
Figure skaters at the 1936 Winter Olympics
Olympic bronze medalists for Sweden
2003 deaths
Olympic medalists in figure skating
World Figure Skating Championships medalists
European Figure Skating Championships medalists
Medalists at the 1936 Winter Olympics